Lăzăreşti may refer to several villages in Romania:

 Lăzăreşti, a village in Moșoaia Commune, Argeș County
 Lăzăreşti, a village in Schitu Golești Commune, Argeș County
 Lăzăreşti, a village in Bumbești-Jiu Town, Gorj County
 Lăzăreşti, a village in Cozmeni Commune, Harghita County
 Lăzăreşti, a village in Bărăști Commune, Olt County

See also 
 Lazăr (name)